St. Elizabeth's Church is a Lutheran church in Pärnu, Estonia.

History and architecture
The present-day church traces its foundation to 1741, when the Russian empress Elizabeth donated 8,000 roubles for the construction of a new church in Pärnu; hence, the church was named after the empress. Construction started in 1744 and the building was finished in 1747, under the guidance of master builder J. H. Güterbock from Riga. The spire, finished somewhat later in 1750, was designed by J. H. Wülbern, who also designed the spire for St. Peter's Church, Riga.

The resulting building is one of the finest ecclesiastical baroque buildings in Estonia, characterised by its relatively grand proportions and simplicity of decoration. Later additions include the neo-Gothic interior decoration and the south transept, designed by another architect from Riga, Häuserman, in 1893. The altarpiece, depicting the resurrection, is a work from the Netherlands, made in Rotterdam in 1854. The organ dates from 1929 and is reputedly one of the finest in Estonia. In 1995, a further extension was added to the church, designed by Estonian architect Ra Luhse.

References

External links
 

Buildings and structures in Pärnu
18th-century establishments in Estonia
18th-century Lutheran churches
Baroque architecture in Estonia
Tourist attractions in Pärnu County
Lutheran churches in Estonia